The Wedgewood Rooms is an independent live music venue, in Southsea, Portsmouth, England, which hosts both music and comedy events.

It has a capacity of 400 people, and is located on Albert Road in Southsea. Recently it has hosted events from up-and-coming British pop and rock artists, such as You Me At Six, Kasabian, Mercury Prize winners Klaxons and Travis. It has also become a favourite venue for artists wishing to play more intimate venues, such as Renegades and Bowling For Soup, as well as one-off / warm-up shows for many bands, including Damon Albarn and Jamie T.

The Wedgewood Rooms, also known as 'The Wedge' by locals, regularly hosts local band nights which help give these bands a wider fan base and a leg up on the music ladder. It also holds comedy, club and tribute nights.

The Edge of the Wedge, attached to the Wedgewood Rooms, regularly hosts local acts, smaller touring acts and DJs.

Performers

Selected international acts
 Albert Hammond Jr.
 Brendan Benson
 Jeff Buckley
 The Brian Jonestown Massacre
 Frank Black
 The Dickies
 Juliette and the Licks
 Kristin Hersh
 The Lemonheads
 Mercury Rev
 Sparklehorse
 Twenty One Pilots
 Vampire Weekend
 Gerard Way - notable for being his first solo show
 CKY
 All Time Low
 Barenaked Ladies
 The Strokes - notable for being their first show in the UK
 The Front Bottoms
 Less Than Jake
 Goldfinger
 Frank Iero and the Patience

Selected British acts
 The Jesus & Mary Chain
 Death In Vegas
 Ed Harcourt
 Spiritualized
 PJ Harvey
 Yuck
The Mission
VANT
 Black Grape
Catfish and the Bottlemen
Urban Vocal Group
 Oasis
 Muse
 Gorillaz
 Kasabian
Primal Scream
Biffy Clyro
Editors
Damon Albarn
Buzzcocks
James
Feeder
Placebo
Supergrass
Razorlight

References

External links
The Wedgewood Rooms website

Buildings and structures in Portsmouth
Music venues in Hampshire
Tourist attractions in Portsmouth